Tulk is a surname. Notable people with the surname include:

 Augustus H. Tulk (1810–1873), Australian librarian, son of Charles Augustus Tulk
 Beaton Tulk (1944–2019), Premier of Newfoundland and Labrador
 Charles Augustus Tulk (1786–1849), English Swedenborgian and politician
 Derek Tulk (born 1934), English cricketer